Mehmet Uğur Taner (born June 20, 1974) is a retired Turkish-born American swimmer.

Taner was born in Istanbul, Turkey, the son of Erol and Gulcin Taner, who moved to the United States one year later. He attended high school at Newport High School in Bellevue, Washington, where he excelled in swimming. The summer after his senior year, he swam for Turkey in the 1992 Summer Olympics. He swam for University of California, Berkeley and was on the US national team from 1993 to 2000, winning nine national individual titles as well as 1994 world champion in the 4 × 100 m freestyle relay.

In 2000, Taner married another internationally recognized swimmer, Liesl Kolbisen, and began to work at her family's swim school, La Petite Baleen. Taner and Kolbisen have 7 children together. A son, Brooks, was born in 2001; daughter Channing followed in 2003; son Vaughn in 2006; daughter Charis in 2008; son Grey in 2010; son Canaan in 2013; and daughter Sevilen in 2017.

Since January 2006, Taner has been playing guitar with the Matt Nightingale Band as well as numerous churches including Mount Hermon.

External links
 
 

Living people
1975 births
American people of Turkish descent
Turkish male freestyle swimmers
American male freestyle swimmers
Swimmers at the 1992 Summer Olympics
Turkish guitarists
Olympic swimmers of Turkey
World Aquatics Championships medalists in swimming
21st-century guitarists
California Golden Bears men's swimmers